Zazem, also rendered as Zazerm and Zazarm, may refer to:
 Zazem-e Olya
 Zazem-e Sofla